Sušice may refer to places in the Czech Republic:

Sušice, a town in the Plzeň Region
Sušice (Přerov District), a municipality and village in the Olomouc Region
Sušice (Uherské Hradiště District), a municipality and village in the Zlín Region
Sušice, a village and part of Dubá in the Liberec Region
Sušice, a village and part of Míčov-Sušice in the Pardubice Region
Sušice, a village and part of Moravská Třebová in the Pardubice Region
Sušice, a village and part of Postupice in the Central Bohemian Region

See also
Sušica (disambiguation)